Fachtna Ó hAllgaith (died 1232) was an Irish erenagh and benefactor.

The Annals of Connacht reference Ó hAllgaith under the year 1232, saying of him:

Fachtna O hAllgaith, coarb of Drumacoo and official of the Ui Fiachrach, who kept a guest-house and a leper-house and was [a man] of learning and a benefactor of the countryside, rested this year.

Drumacoo is an ecclesiastical site in the parish of Ballinderreen, County Galway, which was then referred to as Uí Fiachrach Aidhne.

See also

 Hostel
 Leper colony

External links
 http://www.ucc.ie/celt/published/T100011/index.html
 https://archive.today/20121223112247/http://www.crsbi.ac.uk/search/county/site/id-ga-druma.html
 https://web.archive.org/web/20080515200839/http://www.from-ireland.net/gal/lewis/drumacoo.htm

Medieval Gaels from Ireland
Irish humanitarians
People from County Galway
13th-century Irish people
1232 deaths
Year of birth unknown